Saltatio Mortis is a German medieval metal group. The Latin name means "dance of death". It is an allusion to the Danse Macabre, and a motto of the band is: "He who dances does not die."

Members

Current 
 Alea der Bescheidene - vocals, bagpipes, didgeridoo, guitar, Irish bouzouki, shawms
 Falk Irmenfried von Hasen-Mümmelstein - bagpipes, vocals, hurdy-gurdy, shawms
 El Silbador (since 2006) - bagpipes, shawms, smallpipes, uilleann pipes and other pipes
 Bruder Frank (since 2006) - bass guitars, electric upright Chapman Stick, guitar
 Till Promill (since 2012) - guitars
 Jean Mechant der Tambour (since 2009) - drums, piano, guitar, vocals
 Luzi das L (since 2011) - pipes, shawms, flutes

Past 
 Lasterbalk der Lästerliche (up to 2021) - drums, davul and other percussion
 Dominor der Filigrane (2000 to 2009) - guitars, German bagpipes, shawms
 Die Fackel (2000 to 2006) - bass guitars, mandola, harp, German bagpipes, shawms
 Ungemach der Missgestimmte (2000 to 2006) - guitars, bagpipes, shawms, percussion, programming
 Thoron Trommelfeuer (2000 to 2009) - orchestral percussion
 Herr Schmitt (2004 to 2007) - drums and other percussion
 Mik El Angelo (2006 to 2009) - guitars, lutes, citterns
 Cordoban der Verspielte - shawms, bagpipes, vielle, whistles, vocals
 Herr Samoel (2007 to 2012) - guitars, Irish bouzouki

Discography

Studio albums 
 2001: Tavernakel (Tavernaculum) Napalm Records
 2002: Das zweite Gesicht (The second Face) Napalm Records
 2003: Heptessenz (Seventh Essence) Napalm Records
 26 January 2004: Erwachen (Awakening) Napalm Records
 29 August 2005: Des Königs Henker (The King's Hangman) Napalm Records
 3 September 2007: Aus der Asche (From the Ashes) Napalm Records
 31 August 2009: Wer Wind Sät (Who sows the wind ...) Napalm Records
 29 August 2011: Sturm aufs Paradies (Rush for Paradise) Napalm Records
 16 August 2013: Das Schwarze Einmaleins (The Black 101) Napalm Records
 14 August 2015: Zirkus Zeitgeist (Circus Zeitgeist) We Love Music
 17 August 2018: Brot und Spiele (Bread and Games) Vertigo/Capitol
 9 October 2020: Für immer frei (Forever Free) Vertigo/Capitol

Live albums 
 2005: Manufactum Napalm Records
 2010: Manufactum II Napalm Records
 1 April 2011: 10 Jahre Wild Und Frei (10 Years Wild and Free) Live CD/DVD recorded at the Stadthalle Wuppertal 15/10/2010, Napalm Records
 8 April 2013: Manufactum III Live CD, Napalm Records
 2016: Zirkus Zeitgeist – Live aus der großen Freiheit Live CD, We Love Music

Compilation albums 
 2016: Licht & Schatten - Best Of 2000-2014, We Love Music

Singles 
 2003: "Falsche Freunde"
 2005: "Salz der Erde"
 2009: "Ebenbild"
 2011: "Hochzeitstanz"
 2013: "Früher War Alles Besser", Napalm Records
 12 July 2013: "Wachstum über alles", Napalm Records
 2015: "Wo Sind Die Clowns"
 2022: "The Dragonborn Comes" featuring Lara Loft
 2022: "Pray To The Hunter (The Elder Scrolls Online)"
 2022: "Wir woll'n nach Valhalla"
 2022: "Alive Now"

DVDs 
 1 April 2011: 10 Jahre Wild Und Frei (10 Years Wild and Free) Live CD/DVD recorded at the Stadthalle Wuppertal 15/10/2010, Napalm Records
 13 December 2013: Provocatio - Live Auf Dem Mittelaltermarkt,  Blu-ray and DVD, Napalm Records

Guest appearances 
 2010: All We Are (on 25 Years in Rock... and Still Going Strong by Doro
 2011: Symposium (on Wunsch ist Wunsch by Feuerschwanz)
 2017: Gesegnet und hoch geachtet (Also the Reprisal Version of this song), Kommt herbei und feiert mit (on Der Fluch des Drachen by Corvus Corax
 20 July 2018: We Drink Your Blood (on Communio Lupatum by Powerwolf)
 2020: Krieg kennt keine sieger (Cover) (on The Ghost Xperiment - Illumination by Vanden Plas
 2021: Warriors of the World United feat Angus McFife, Melissa Bonny  (on Memento Mori by )
 2022: Good Life (on Not The End of the Road by Kissin' Dynamite (credited as Jorg Roth)
 2022: It's Raining Beer (on Lang Liebe Der Hass'' by ) (credited as Alea)

References

External links 

  (German)
 Saltatio Mortis at Napalm Records

Medieval metal musical groups
Musical groups established in 2000
Napalm Records artists